Govinda Govinda is a 2021 Indian Kannada comedy thriller film directed by Thilak, making his debut. The film was jointly produced by S. Shailendra Babu, M. K. Kishore and Ravi R. Garani. It features Sumanth Shailendra in the lead role. The supporting cast includes Vijay Chendur, Pavan and Achyuth Kumar. The score and soundtrack for the film is by Hithan Hasan and the cinematography is by K. S. Chandrasekhar. The film is an official remake of 2019 Telugu film Brochevarevarura.

Plot

Cast 

 Sumanth Shailendra as Venkatesha
 Bhavana as Padmavathi
 Roopesh Shetty as Srinivas
 Kavitha Gowda as Alamelu
 Vijay Chendur as Hari Dodkunde
 Pavan as Keshav Karade
 Achyuth Kumar as Principal Sheshachala, Alamelu's father
 Shobaraj as Inspector Narayana
 V. Manohar as Ramana, Venkatesha's father
 Padma Vasanthi as Ratnamma
 Ajay Ghosh as Tirupati
 Kaddipudi Chandru as Narahari
 K. Manju as Producer

Production 
The film was announced in December 2019 after the shoot had started. The film marks comeback of actor Sumanth Shailendra to Kannada films. The team had Bhavana reprising the role of Nivetha Pethuraj and Kavitha Gowda reprising the role of Nivetha Thomas from the original. The film later had Tulu actor Roopesh Shetty play the another male lead role. The filming of the film had taken place in Vijayapura and in and around Bengaluru.

Soundtrack 

The film's background score and the soundtracks are composed by Hithan Hassan. The music rights were acquired by Pushkar Films.

Release and reception 
The film was earlier slated to release on 16 April 2021 but owing to COVID-19 pandemic the film was theatrically released on 26 November 2021.

The Times Of India gave 3/5 stars stating "Govinda Govinda is a fun ride, filled with humour and thrills. The second half of the story has some good substance. This can make for a good family outing"

The New Indian Express gave 2.5/5 stars stating "The comedy-drama, which comes with an underlying message, does make for a one-time watch that had the potential to be a fun ride. "

References

External links 

 

Kannada remakes of Telugu films
2020s Kannada-language films
2021 comedy films
Indian comedy films
2021 directorial debut films
Films shot in Bangalore